Sussex County Cricket Club is one of the 18 member clubs of the English County Championship, representing the historic county of Sussex. Although Sussex representative sides had been playing cricket since the mid-eighteenth century and had also played first-class cricket matches since 1815, the County Cricket Club was established on 1 March 1839. They have played first-class matches since 1839, List A matches since 1963, and Twenty20 matches since 2003.

Unlike most professional sports, in which a team usually has a single fixed home ground, county cricket clubs have traditionally used different grounds in various towns and cities within the county for home matches, although the use of minor "out grounds" away from the club's main headquarters has diminished since the 1980s. In total, Sussex have played first-class, List A and Twenty20 cricket at 17 different grounds across the county.

The club's first fixture was played at the Royal New Ground, Brighton. The ground was Sussex's main ground until 1848, when  the Royal Brunswick Ground in Brunswick, Hove became the main ground. In 1872, the land of the Royal Brunswick Ground was required for the expansion of the town, so the club relocated to the County Ground, which continues to be the main ground for Sussex Cricket Club. The County Ground was the venue where Sussex claimed the 2003 and 2007 County Championships. It is also the only ground in Sussex to have hosted international cricket; in the 1999 World Cup, a One Day International between India and South Africa was played at the ground.

In 1849, the club used a venue outside Brighton for the first time, when they played a first-class match at Petworth Park New Ground; the match against Surrey is notable for being one of Sussex's lowest aggregate scoring matches of all time, with only 287 runs scored. It was also the only time that Petworth Park hosted a Sussex match. Sussex have frequently used out grounds to host some of their matches, typically as part of cricket festivals. In the nineteenth and twentieth centuries, their main out grounds were the Central Recreation Ground in Hastings, The Saffrons in Eastbourne, the Cricket Field Road Ground in Horsham, and the Arundel Castle Cricket Ground (from 1972). After the Central Recreation Ground was demolished in 1996, Sussex also played two List A matches at Horntye Park, Hastings' other cricket ground. Eastbourne cancelled its proposed fixture in 2001 and did not host another county match until 2017, whilst Horsham was not awarded any matches for the 2016 season, due to financial difficulties. Due to the COVID-19 pandemic, all of Sussex's matches in 2020 and 2021 were played at the County Ground. In 2020, Hampshire played some "home" fixtures at Arundel, as the Rose Bowl was being used by England.

The County Ground and Arundel Castle are the only two grounds to have hosted Sussex Twenty20 matches.

Grounds
Below is a complete list of grounds used by Sussex County Cricket Club for first-class, List A and Twenty20 matches. Statistics are complete through to the end of the 2020 season. Only matches played by Sussex County Cricket Club since its establishment in 1839 are included in the table. Matches abandoned without any play occurring are not included.

Notes

References

Sussex County Cricket Club
Cricket grounds in Sussex
Sussex
Lists of buildings and structures in Sussex
Sussex-related lists